Aureopterix sterops is a moth of the family Micropterigidae. It is known from eastern Australia, where it is known from northern Queensland, in wet coastal or elevated coastal forest between Mount Finnigan and Kirrama State Forest.

The forewing ground colour is pale shining silvery ochreous, with weakly marked fasciae either dark bronzy brown or pale pinkish brown. These are more distinct in the female than in the male. There are a few dark brown scales along the costal edge at the base and a very small brown basal triangular patch on the costa. There is also an interrupted oblique transverse fascia at about one fifth with a small costal patch, an even smaller spot in the middle and another on the anal margin, the latter often pale bronze. Furthermore, there is a stronger, but also interrupted, fascia at about mid-length, markedly concave inwards, the costal and anal ends triangular onto the margins. Finally, a very pale bronzy transverse fascia at four-fifths. The fringes are pale ochreous. The hindwing is shining silvery ochreous and very slightly darker than the forewing colour.

References

External links

Micropterigidae
Moths described in 1921
Endemic fauna of Australia
Moths of Australia